Pragathi Dharmaram is a village situated in Medak district, India, with Ramayampet as its mandal headquarters.

ZPHS High School
ZPHS (Zilla Parishat High School), Dharmaram is one of the oldest schools in Medak district.

External links

Villages in Medak district